The Gathering is the title of a studio album released by the Caribbean Jazz Project on June 11, 2002. Dave Samuels, Dave Valentin and Paquito D'Rivera are the main performers on the album, which was awarded with a Grammy Award for Best Latin Jazz Album.

Track listing
The track listing from Allmusic.

Chart performance

References

2002 albums
Caribbean Jazz Project albums
Grammy Award for Best Latin Jazz Album